Swindle was a bi-monthly arts and culture publication founded in 2004 by artist Shepard Fairey. The magazine has not been published since 2009.

The magazine had a strong focus on street art and has featured Banksy, Invader, Faile, and Miss Van on its cover. Swindle has featured interviews with celebrities such as Billy Idol, Debbie Harry, and Grandmaster Flash. In 2006 and 2007, Swindle compiled annual Icons issues that featured 50 leading art and culture figures.

Shepard Fairey's Studio Number-One produced the magazine until early 2009. Art direction for the magazine was done by Smyrski Creative. In addition to its regular staff, Swindle had contributors from the music, fashion, and creative industries, including Fairey, Banksy, Henry Rollins, Caroline Ryder, Clint Catalyst, Day19, Shawna Kenney, and Damien Hirst.

In 2006, Advertising Age picked Swindle'''s issue 8 as one of the "10 Magazine Covers We Loved." The L.A. Weekly listed Swindle'''s creators among the "L.A. People of 2006."

References

External links
 Swindle Magazine homepage
 Studio Number-One homepage

Visual arts magazines published in the United States
Bimonthly magazines published in the United States
Independent magazines
Magazines established in 2004
Magazines disestablished in 2009
Defunct magazines published in the United States